Jiří Sýkora (born 3 May 1977) is a retired Czech midfielder.

References

1977 births
Living people
Czech footballers
FK Chmel Blšany players
Association football midfielders